The Family That Preys is a 2008 American comedy-drama film, written, produced, and directed by Tyler Perry. The screenplay focuses on two families, one wealthy and the other working class, whose lives are intertwined in both love and business.

Plot
In the prologue, socialite Charlotte Cartwright hosts the wedding of Andrea—the daughter of Charlotte's best friend, Alice Evans—and Chris Bennett, a construction worker. The couple is congratulated by Charlotte's son, William, and his wife, Jillian, who had eloped instead of letting Charlotte plan an elaborate reception for them. William suggests that the newlyweds contact him for employment with the Cartwrights's successful Atlanta construction company after their honeymoon.

Four years later, Andrea's sister, Pam, is married to Ben and looks after Andrea's three-year-old son for extra income while working at their mother's diner. To Pam's chagrin, Andrea doesn't help their mother more financially, though Andrea has designer clothes and a new Mercedes. Andrea is actually enjoying the perks of being in an extramarital affair with William.

Chris dreams of opening a construction firm with Ben, but Andrea ridicules Chris's aspirations. At the bank, Chris is rejected for a loan application, but discovers his wife has deposited nearly $300,000 in a secret account. Andrea catches Chris going through her hidden financial records one night. She tells him that the money is bonuses she received from William and that she has the right to some privacy from her spouse. She refuses to finance his business.

William is determined to take the family business from his mother, believing the $500-million deal he recently closed will prove his capabilities. Charlotte hires Abigail "Abby" Dexter as COO and determines the company will have to front $25 million to make William's deal viable. The only way to raise the money is for Charlotte to sell 10% of her shares, leaving her with a minority vote. William tells Abby that Charlotte's vote and his vote combined will give the Cartwrights continued control; Abby advises Charlotte to sell her shares.

Charlotte asks Alice to go on a road trip in the vintage turquoise Cadillac convertible Charlotte has bought. Alice eventually agrees, and they head west without a set route or schedule. Charlotte introduces Alice to honky-tonks and male strip clubs; Alice reciprocates by taking Charlotte to a communal baptism. One night, Charlotte becomes stressed out over her camera and reveals she has early-onset Alzheimer's disease. She has been told nothing can slow her mental decline.

At the company gala, both Jillian and Abby discover Andrea and William's affair. William later fires both Chris and Ben after Chris asks him for money to start a construction business of their own. Abby warns Andrea of the repercussions of the affair that will likely result in her termination from the company, only for Andrea to rebuff this as she fervently believes William will protect her. Convinced that they were marital assets, Chris takes the money from the hidden account and pays deposits to start a construction firm with Ben.

Charlotte and Alice return to Atlanta. Andrea confronts Chris for taking her $300,000. She says he and Ben will never be like William. Ben states that nobody cares about William and that Andrea can't see that because of the affair. Andrea admits to Chris that the money was from William, her lover. Angry and disgusted, Chris slaps her, sending her flying over the counter. Andrea, further incensed, tells him to keep the money and move out. As Chris brings up their son, Andrea says William is the father.

Alice tries to persuade Andrea to end her affair with William and reconcile with Chris, explaining to her that their affair will not last and William will never marry her, begging her to stop before her life is destroyed.  Andrea refuses to believe her, and says if that happens, she will enjoy the ride on the way down.

William is plotting to take over the family firm. Although they had never been close, Jillian goes to Charlotte for advice. Charlotte offers little consolation, but reminds her that she is a woman scorned without a prenuptial agreement, and as such can divorce or reconcile and be okay either way. Jillian warns Charlotte of William's plan to have the board vote her out.

Chris confronts William on a job site and punches him. Jillian then confronts Andrea in the hotel room where trysts with William were held each Wednesday, and warns her to stay away from her family and that William won’t be seeing her again.

Charlotte calls a board meeting and fires William with the support of the Calvary Company, a silent investor revealed to be Alice. Alice has been receiving financial guidance for years from Nicholas "Nick" Blanchett, a homeless man she frequently fed at her diner. Earlier, it is explained that Nick had been a regular customer who left large tips until he lost his job, wife, and custody of his children. Nick still visits the diner regularly and pays Alice with solid investment advice. Later, it is revealed that Nick had been working for William as a powerful stockbroker until William fired him without cause.

In the parking lot, Andrea approaches William unaware of the recent events and expecting him to leave Jillian for her. Instead, he washes his hands of Andrea, and drives away, ignoring her claim that he is her son's father. Charlotte takes a deadly combination of pills and calls Alice, who has an emotional breakdown. Despondently, Alice gives the eulogy at Charlotte's funeral.

The movie ends with Chris and Andrea parting, with the paternity of their son left unclear. Chris is now wealthier after opening a firm with Ben. Andrea on  the other hand is now sad, guilt-ridden, lonely, heartbroken and now unemployed. She is forced to live in a low-rent apartment and rely on child support from Chris to survive, with her worst fears realized. Nick is wealthy and buys a house. William & Jillian reconcile, slowly salvaging their marriage. Alice decides to sell the diner, driving off in the car that Charlotte left her (with a photo of her and Charlotte taped to the dashboard) to start life anew on the road.

Cast
 Alfre Woodard as Alice Reynolds-Evans 
 Sanaa Lathan as Andrea Evans-Bennett 
 KaDee Strickland as Jillian Cartwright 
 Cole Hauser as William Cartwright 
 Rockmond Dunbar as Chris Bennett 
 Taraji P. Henson as Pam Evans
 Robin Givens as Abigail "Abby" Dexter 
 Tyler Perry as Ben
 Kathy Bates as Charlotte Cartwright 
 Sebastian Siegel as Nicholas "Nick" Blanchett

Reception

Box office
The film opened in 2,070 theaters in North America on September 12, 2008 and grossed $17.4 million in its opening weekend, ranking #2 at the box office behind Burn After Reading. It eventually earned $37.1 million domestically, making it the second-least successful of Tyler Perry's films ahead of Daddy's Little Girls.

Critical response 
On Rotten Tomatoes, the film holds an approval rating of 53% based on 43 reviews, with an average rating of 5.90/10. The website's critics consensus reads: "Tyler Perry's The Family That Preys treads the filmmaker's established terrain of family loyalty and moral uprightness, though the occasionally predictable plot slides forward, aided by an excess of soapy melodrama." Metacritic assigned the film a weighted average score of 49 out of 100, based on 14 critics, indicating "mixed or average reviews". Audiences polled by CinemaScore gave the film an average grade of "A" on an A+ to F scale.

Stephen Holden of The New York Times said, "The suds that cascade through [the film] more than equal the cubic footage from nighttime soaps like Dallas, Dynasty and their offspring. As the movie proceeds, the flow quickens into a surging flood tide of recriminations and reversals in which blows are exchanged, claws bared and tears shed . . . The Family That Preys doesn’t worry about how it gets from A to Z. There is no problem that a miraculous (and preposterous) plot development can’t resolve in two minutes."

The New York Daily News rated the film three out of five stars and commented, "Perry's notoriously overstuffed plots have sometimes been top-heavy, but this movie, like Woody Allen's Hannah and Her Sisters, hangs on an elegant structure that doesn't feel forced. Perry's skills as a director have improved as his casts have gotten better, and he gives the lovely Woodard one of her most satisfying roles . . . By melding the pleasures of 1950s-style melodrama . . . with equal-gender, African-American-aimed plots, Perry has found success in a niche only he now occupies. And by adding Christian tenets and modern issues . . . Perry shows he knows what his audience wants. First and foremost, that's a smart, satisfying movie experience, which Family is."

Claudia Puig of USA Today said the best thing about the film "is the opportunity it affords to watch a pair of veteran actresses still at the top of their game. Alfre Woodard and Kathy Bates play best pals in this soap opera-style story, and the moments each are on-screen are undeniably the movie's best. One senses a rapport and chemistry between the women that transcends the formulaic plot."

Stephen Farber of The Hollywood Reporter observed, "Although this interracial Dynasty isn't always believable - it's a stretch to accept the lifelong friendship of the two matriarchs as well as the last-minute business coup that they engineer - there's plenty of action to keep us engrossed. Perry wears his religious faith lightly . . . and is shrewd enough to balance piety with raucous humor and lots of sinful shenanigans. Perry's filmmaking skills have improved to the level of competence, and he has assembled a dream cast."

Roger Moore of the Orlando Sentinel rated the film two out of five stars and called it Tyler Perry's "most cinematically polished production to date" but also "yet another example of how the mini-mogul from Atlanta is his own worst enemy, raiding his cupboard of his popular but pandering stage plays and not bothering to script doctor them for the screen. As sophisticated as the filmmaking becomes, Perry's scripts are still painfully unsophisticated grab-bags of melodramatic cliches, tired jokes and sermonizing."

Peter Debruge of Variety said the film "recycles familiar ingredients according to his own unique formula, serving up a lip-smacking, finger-snapping sudser" and added, "Perry has a tendency to overload his features, and The Family That Preys is no exception, reflecting the helmer's view that the emotional roller-coaster of life can whip its passengers from outrage to exhilaration, from belly laughs to tears in an instant, making for an exhausting yet cathartic overall experience. The result seems ideal for [audiences] who don't see too many movies, cramming enough into one film to satisfy them until the next Perry pic comes out."

Monika Fabian of Time Out New York said, "As with Perry’s other films, his Christian moralistic storytelling can be slightly off-putting — but the solid acting and genuinely entertaining story are sure to satisfy fans, and maybe even bring in some converts."

Ken Fox of TV Guide rated the film three out of four stars and said, "Thanks to some first-rate acting from its stars, it ranks among Perry's best."

Tom Becker of DVD Verdict said, "The Family That Preys has that Love Boat kind of watchability and simplicity. Everything runs in a straight line, all endings are inevitable, and emotions and morals are no more complex than a well-timed platitude. The characters are amalgams of recognizable types plunked down in sitcom settings that elicit near-Pavlovian responses of cheers, jeers, and tears. Here and there, Perry throws us a curve ball—an act of physical violence presented as deserved comeuppance or a character's grim and dubiously appropriate endgame—but even these are not jarring enough to derail it. This is film as comfort food, and not the gourmet kind."

Brian Orndorf of DVD Talk said, "Preys" is a soap opera in the most unashamed sense, and while this aesthetic has made Perry heaps of coin, his personal screen touch remains some of the worst overall filmmaking around. The new feature is perhaps even more melodramatic than anything that's come before, taking the Andrea/William affair and using it as the inspiration for the cast to arch their eyebrows to assured cramp, flare nostrils in unintentional comedic fury, and bounce impassioned lines of dialogue off each other with medicine ball grace. It's equal parts hilarious and aggravating, with Perry showing little shame as he works the characters into pants-wetting hysteria."

Gregory Kirschling from Entertainment Weekly stated, "Tyler Perry's melodramas have a tendency to skid not only off the counter but out the kitchen and down the hall, too. The Family That Preys, his first film in six months, is all over the place: It's a boardroom/family/couples/road-trip story. Kathy Bates plays the head of an Atlanta construction company where Sanaa Lathan is a snooty exec and her husband (Rockmond Dunbar), for maximum class/race sizzle, is a worker grunt. As usual, the villains, like Lathan, are very bad, and the good guys, like Dunbar, are very noble — until they get mad and clock their wives."

Awards
At the Black Reel Awards, both Alfre Woodard and Sanaa Lathan were nominated for Best Actress. Also Tyler Perry was nominated for Best Screenplay, Original or Adapted.

Taraji P. Henson won Best Actress at the BET Awards for her role in the film combined with two other performances in Not Easily Broken, and The Curious Case of Benjamin Button.

Home media
The film was released on Blu-ray Disc and DVD on January 13, 2009. It is in anamorphic widescreen format, with audio tracks and subtitles in English and Spanish. Bonus features include deleted scenes, Two Families, Two Legends, which spotlights stars Alfre Woodard and Kathy Bates; Preying in the Big Easy, about filming in New Orleans; Casting the Family, with interviews with the director and cast, and Delving into the Diner, in which production designer Ina Mayhew discusses her concept for the set.

References

External links
 
 
 

2008 films
2008 comedy-drama films
American comedy-drama films
African-American films
Films about dysfunctional families
Films about interracial romance
Films about the upper class
Films directed by Tyler Perry
Films scored by Aaron Zigman
Films set in Georgia (U.S. state)
Films shot in Georgia (U.S. state)
Films shot in New Orleans
Films with screenplays by Tyler Perry
Lionsgate films
2000s English-language films
2000s American films